PSPM may refer to:

Principal Secretary to the Prime Minister of Pakistan
Public Security Police Force of Macau